Pavel Grigoryevich Kotov (born 21 June 1995) is a Russian professional football player. Kotov plays for FC Neftekhimik Nizhnekamsk.

Club career
He made his professional debut on 24 September 2014 for PFC CSKA Moscow in a Russian Cup game against FC Khimik Dzerzhinsk.

References

External links
 
 

1995 births
People from Dedovsk
Sportspeople from Moscow Oblast
Living people
Russian footballers
Association football defenders
PFC CSKA Moscow players
FC Neftekhimik Nizhnekamsk players
FC Stumbras players
FC Strogino Moscow players
FC Veles Moscow players
Russian First League players
Russian Second League players
A Lyga players
Russian expatriate footballers
Expatriate footballers in Lithuania
Russian expatriate sportspeople in Lithuania